Wilmersdorf (Angermünde) station is a railway station in the Wilmersdorf district in the municipality of Angermünde, located in the Uckermark district in Brandenburg, Germany. The station lies on the Angermünde–Stralsund railway and the train services are operated by Deutsche Bahn.

Train services
The station is served by the following service(s):

Regional services  Stralsund - Greifswald - Pasewalk - Angermünde - Berlin - Ludwigsfelde - Jüterbog - Falkenberg - Elsterwerda

References

Railway stations in Brandenburg
Buildings and structures in Uckermark (district)
Railway stations in Germany opened in 1863